Voy a pasármelo bien is a 2022 Spanish-Mexican musical comedy film directed by David Serrano. Named after the eponymous music album by Hombres G, it features songs by the aforementioned band. It stars Raúl Arévalo, Karla Souza, and Dani Rovira.

Plot 
The fiction is set in Valladolid. Initially taking place in 1989, the plot features two tweens (David and Layla) bonded by their love of Hombres G who meet again decades later, when Layla, having become a successful filmmaker, visits her hometown.

Cast

Production 
The screenplay of Voy a pasármelo bien was penned by David Serrano alongside Luz Cipriota. A Spanish-Mexican co-production, the film was produced by El Estudio and Sony Pictures International Productions alongside Les Parapluies Rochefort AIE and Paraíso Torres de Satélite. The film also had support from the Valladolid Film Office. Production began filming on 6 August 2021. Shooting took place in Spain, including Valladolid and Guadalajara.

Release 
Distributed by Sony Pictures Entertainment Iberia, the film was theatrically released in Spain on 12 August 2022. Amazon Prime Video (in exclusivity for the first five years) and RTVE nabbed streaming rights for the post-theatrical window.

Reception 
Raquel Hernández Luján of HobbyConsolas scored 80 out of 100 points ("very good") deeming the film to be "very enjoyable in every way", praising the balance between drama and comedy as well as the young cast, while finding that the budget constraints are noticeable, especially in outdoor settings.

Andrea G. Bermejo of Cinemanía rated the film 3½ out of 5 stars assessing that the cast, artwork, costumes and staging make up a measured and "soulful" nostalgic journey, even if some elements from the past timeline are reiterative and some scenes from the present timeline are somewhat lacking.

Federico Marín Bellón of ABC rated the film 4 out of 5 stars, writing that Serrano (jointly with Cipriota), manages to  "compose a story full of good taste and desire to have a good time".

Top ten lists 
The film appeared on a number of critics' top ten lists of the best Spanish films of 2022:

Accolades 

|-
| rowspan = "2" align = "center" | 2023 || rowspan = "1" | 10th Feroz Awards || colspan = "2" | Best Comedy Film ||  || rowspan = "1" | 
|-
| 78th CEC Medals || Best New Actor || David Lorente ||  || 
|}

See also 
 List of Spanish films of 2022

References 

2022 comedy films
Films shot in Castile and León
Films shot in the province of Guadalajara
Films set in 1989
Films set in Castile and León
2020s musical comedy films
Mexican musical comedy films
Spanish musical comedy films
2020s Spanish-language films
2020s Spanish films
2020s Mexican films